Calisto obscura is a butterfly of the family Nymphalidae. It is endemic to Hispaniola, where it is found in the lowlands and at mid-elevations.

The larvae feed on various grasses.

References

Butterflies described in 1943
Calisto (butterfly)